Andrea Cisco (born 8 October 1998) is an Italian professional footballer who plays as a winger for  club Virtus Francavilla on loan from Pisa.

Career
Cisco made his Serie C debut for Padova on 10 April 2017 in a game against Venezia.

On 31 January 2018, he was signed by the Serie A club Sassuolo, who loaned him back to Padova until the end of the 2017–18 season. At the end of the season the loan has been extended.

On 9 January 2019, he was loaned by Sassuolo to Albissola in Serie C until the end of the season.

On 28 June 2019, Cisco joined Pescara on loan until 30 June 2021 with Pescara holding an obligation to buy his rights at the end of the loan.

On 21 January 2020, he moved on loan to Serie C club Novara for a 1.5-year term with an option to purchase.

On 11 August 2021, he joined Pisa permanently.

On 29 January 2022, he went to Teramo on loan. On 26 August 2022, Cisco moved on loan to Virtus Francavilla.

References

External links
 

1998 births
Living people
Sportspeople from Padua
Italian footballers
Association football wingers
Serie B players
Serie C players
Calcio Padova players
U.S. Sassuolo Calcio players
Albissola 2010 players
Delfino Pescara 1936 players
Novara F.C. players
Pisa S.C. players
S.S. Teramo Calcio players
Virtus Francavilla Calcio players
Footballers from Veneto